Kathauna Bazar is a city in Shambhunath Municipality Ward No. 6, in the Saptari district of Nepal. It is 20 km east of Lahan Municipality, and is the central city of Shambhunath Municipality. Shambhunath municipality's head office is located at Kathauna Bazar. At the time of the 1991 Nepal census it had a population of 5167 people, living in 933 individual households.

List of Educational Institutions in Kathauna Bazar 

 Chaudhary Computer Training Center, Kathauna Bazar
 Sharda English Secondary School, Kathauna Bazar, Shambhunath Municipality
 Shree Buddhi Lal Bidya Munar H.S.S, Bhagwatpur
 Shree Shambhunath English Boarding School

List of Industries inside Kathauna Bazar 
 Shree Ganesh Rice Mill 
 Pramod Rice Mill

List of Banks in Kathauna 
Rastriya Banijya Bank, Kathauna Bazar Branch
 Nirdhan Bank
 Mahuli Bikas Samudai

Transport

Road
Buses of all classes (deluxe, air-conditioned, and regular) ply daily between Kathauna and major cities such as Biratnagar, Kathmandu, Pokhara, Birgunj and Kakarbhitta through Mahendra Highway.

Air
Kathauna is reached by Rajbiraj Airport since, a regular scheduled flight has been organized from Rajbiraj, the flight was halted since 2007. See Rajbiraj Airport.

External links 
 www.facebook.com/ktn.city

References

Populated places in Saptari District